The Anglo-Egyptian Darfur Expedition of 1916 was a military operation by the British Empire and the Sultanate of Egypt, launched as a preemptive invasion of the Sultanate of Darfur.

The sultan of Darfur Ali Dinar had been reinstated by the British after their victory in the Mahdist War but during the First World War he grew restive, refusing his customary tribute to the Sudanese government and showing partiality to the Ottoman Empire in 1915.

Sirdar Reginald Wingate then organized a force of around 2,000 men; under the command of  Philip James Vandeleur Kelly, the force entered Darfur in March 1916 and decisively defeated the Fur Army at Beringia and occupied the capital El Fasher in May. Ali Dinar had already fled to the mountains and his attempts to negotiate a surrender were eventually broken off by the British. His location becoming known, a small force was sent after him and the sultan was killed in action in November 1916. Subsequently, Darfur was fully annexed to the British administration of the Anglo-Egyptian Sudan and remained part of Sudan upon its independence.

Background

In the late 19th and early 20th centuries Darfur, which means "land of the Fur", was an independent country, located to the west of Sudan and east of what was then French Equatorial Africa.

The Sultanate of Darfur was one of the kingdoms that stretched across the centre of Africa. In 1874, it was invaded by its Islamic neighbours from the south, which resulted in the country being annexed by Egypt and joined with Anglo-Egyptian Sudan. This lasted until the Mahdist War (1881–1899), when Anglo-Egyptian suzerainty was temporarily curtailed by the forces of Muhammad Ahmad, until Anglo-Egyptian control of the region was re-established following the battle of Omdurman on 2 September 1898. In 1899, Ali Dinar became the Sultan of Darfur with the approval of the then Sirdar Lord Kitchener, on the condition that he paid an annual tribute to the British. Relations between Dinar and the Anglo-Egyptians were assisted by the Inspector-General Rudolf Carl von Slatin who had knowledge of the Darfur region and its people.

The status quo remained until disputes started over what was Darfur's exact western boundary and who had "overlordship" over its frontier districts. The British believed the delay in resolving these disputes, along with anti-government propaganda, led to a change in Dinar's attitude towards them. Their beliefs were not helped by Dinar's refusal to allow any Europeans to enter Darfur. Dinar's domestic policies caused internal unrest among the Arab portion of the population who were generally against him, or in the case of the Rizeigat tribe from the south-west Darfur, "openly hostile".

On hearing the news of war between the British Empire and Turkey, Dinar became more defiant and in April 1915 renounced his allegiance to the Anglo-Egyptian Sudan Government, declaring himself pro-Turkish and making contact with them via the Senussi. At the time, Darfur had a population of just under 1,000,000 controlled by what was described as a "slave army" of about 10,000 men. By December, affairs had deteriorated to such an extent that a small unit from the Egyptian Camel Corps was dispatched to protect trade at Nahud, and at the same time act as a warning against Dinar's proposed offensive against the Rizeigat tribe. Dinar instead countered the deployment of the Camel Corps detachment by moving his own troops—forty cavalry and ninety infantry—to reinforce Jebel el Hella. However, by then the British believed he was preparing for an invasion of Sudan.

Expedition

To counter the expected threat to Sudan, Sirdar Reginald Wingate gathered a force together at Nahud. The commander was British Lieutenant Colonel Philip James Vandeleur Kelly, of the 3rd The King's Own Hussars, on secondment to the Egyptian Army. The force was composed of:
 Two companies of mounted infantry, commanded by Major Cobden, 9th Lancers;
 Five companies from the Camel Corps, commanded by Major Huddleston, Dorsetshire Regiment;
 Six companies from the 13th and 14th Battalions, Sudanese Infantry, commanded by Major Bayly, Royal Welsh Fusiliers and Major Darwell, Royal Marine Light Infantry;
 Two companies from the Arab Battalion, commanded by Major Cowan, Cameron Highlanders;
 Two companies from the 14th Battalion, Egyptian Infantry;
 Two 12-pounder artillery batteries, which also included two Maxim machine guns, commanded by Major Spinks Royal Artillery; and
 One Maxim machine gun battery.

With medical and other non-combat units, the force totaled around 2,000 men. Intelligence gathered supported the theory that Dinar was going to invade Sudan, so in March 1916, Wingate ordered Kelly to cross the border and occupy Jebel el Hella and Um Shanga. The two villages offered the only permanent water supplies that were on the road to El Fasher, Dinar's capital.

On 16 March, five companies from the Camel Corps and mounted infantry scouts, supported by a 12-pounder artillery battery and a Maxim machine gun battery, crossed the Darfur frontier and four days later occupied Um Shanga. Their only opposition was from a small observation post which was forced to withdraw. Unexpectedly, upon arrival, the Anglo-Egyptian force found the water supply at Um Shanga scarce. With the main body of his force expected to arrive that evening, having only two days' supply of water with them, Kelly considered withdrawing back to Sudan. Instead, he divided his force, forming a fast-moving column, consisting of thirty mounted infantry scouts, 240 men from the Camel Corps, two artillery pieces, and eight Maxims, which left for Jebel el Hella at dawn on 22 March.

Jebel el Hella

Kelly's flying column faced only slight opposition from Fur scouts until they reached a position  from Jebel el Hella. There, a force of 800 Fur horsemen tried to surround them and were only prevented from doing so by Anglo-Egyptian machine gun fire. Advancing a further  the flying column located a large concentration of Fur troops in a wooded valley, where they engaged with artillery and machine guns. Having forced the Fur troops to disperse, the column reached Jebel el Hella at 14:15 and secured its wells without any further opposition. During their advance, the Anglo-Egyptian casualties were described as "insignificant" while the Fur forces had lost twenty men dead and wounded. With the occupation of Jebel el Hella complete, the Anglo-Egyptians had secured one of the invasion routes into Sudan.

The main Fur Army was now located in the capital of El Fasher and was estimated to consist of between 4,000 and 6,000 riflemen with adequate supplies of ammunition. Their equipment ranged from older muzzleloader weapons, such as Martini–Henry and Remington rifles and shotguns, to spears, shields and chain mail. They were supported by an unknown number of auxiliary troops armed only with spears. At the same time Dinar was concentrating his troops from other regions in the capital. Those in contact with the Anglo-Egyptian forces and some small number of reinforcements were instead grouped at Burush and Kedada.

Supply problems

Wingate believed that Dinar would avoid a large battle in the provinces, but would instead gather his troops at El Fasher, until the rainy period started, which would benefit their style of guerrilla fighting and raids on the Anglo-Egyptian column and their lines of communication. However, Kelly's immediate concern was providing water and other supplies to his troops. The Anglo-Egyptian expedition coincided with a period of no rainfall and once all the native food supplies had been used, their nearest supply point was the railhead at El-Obeid  to the west. To overcome some of their supply problems Wingate started construction of a road suitable for trucks, which he had obtained to supplement his camel transport. Once completed, a journey on the road by vehicles, from the rail line to the capital, would take four days. General Sir Archibald Murray, the commander of the Egyptian Expeditionary Force fighting in the Sinai and Palestine Campaign, arranged for the Royal Flying Corps (RFC) to send a flight of four aeroplanes, 15-pounder guns and ammunition, wireless communication sets and light transport vehicles, to assist the expedition.

April reconnaissance

In early April, Anglo-Egyptian reconnaissance patrols located small numbers of Fur troops at Burush, Um Eisheishat and Um Kedda. To their south the Fur troops deployed at Taweisha were withdrawn to Tulu. Kelly ordered a large reconnaissance force to head west to Abiad. They had three objectives: locate any water supplies, for their men and animals; disperse any Fur troops at Burush and Um Kedada; and deny the Fur forces access to the water wells at Abiad and at the same time secure the route between Nahud and El Fasher. On 3 April, the Anglo-Egyptian force, consisting of two mounted infantry companies, four artillery pieces, six Maxim machine guns and the 13th Sudanese Battalion companies, reached Burush by midday forcing out a Fur cavalry unit. The next day they continued their advance towards Um Kedada. This time they met a Fur force of 700 men, some entrenched in front of the wells, but the Anglo-Egyptian guns opened fire on them forcing them to withdraw. Four days later, on 8 April, the Anglo-Egyptian reconnaissance continued, reaching Abiad early the next day only to find that the Fur troops had left the previous evening. Leaving four Sudanese infantry companies and four guns behind the remaining Anglo-Egyptian reconnaissance force continued deeper into Darfur. The garrison left
behind at Abiad was attacked on 14 and 15 April, but casualties are not recorded. By the end of the month the lines of communication road was secured, with large detachments of Anglo-Egyptian troops left at Abiad, Um Kedada, Burush, Lugud, Jebel el Hella and Um Shanga. At the same time a system of observation posts was established along the frontier from Gabr el Dar to Shebb manned by 260 friendly natives, who were issued with Remington rifles. Another 200 men belonging to the Kababish tribe occupied Jebel Meidob, observing the road from Darfur to the Senussi lands in the north.

May advance to contact

In May, the Anglo-Egyptian forces started reinforcing their lines of communication and bringing forward supplies to enable them to continue the advance. On 12 May, an RFC reconnaissance aircraft flew over El Fasher dropping leaflets to the population. The leaflets denounced Dinar and promised that once he was removed there would be religious freedom and justice for all, and that the tribal leaders would remain in position if they submitted, and there would be an end to repression.

By 14 May Kelly had completed his preparations to advance to El Fasher and had gathered a force at Abiad consisting of sixty mounted infantry scouts, four companies from the Camel Corps with two Maxim machine guns of their own, eight companies from the 13th and 14th Sudanese Infantry and the Arab Battalion. They were supported by eight artillery pieces, fourteen Maxim machine guns and a field hospital. Still suffering from a shortage of water Kelly divided the force into two columns. "A" Column would be slow moving, while "B" Column would be more mobile. Reconnaissance patrols had located a small Fur garrison at Meliet and Kelly made that his first objective. Once Meliet had been captured the Anglo-Egyptians would be well positioned to attack the capital, El Fasher.

Just after 04:00 on 15 May a small unit of mounted infantry scouts, captured a Fur observation post  from Abiad, taking prisoner all bar two of the Fur soldiers, who managed to escape on foot. The slow moving "A" Column left Abiad on 15 May followed by the "B" Column the next day. Both columns reached the rendezvous on 17 May. The same morning an RFC reconnaissance aircraft bombed a force of around 500 Fur troops at Meliat. The next day both of Kelly's columns reached the village, which had been evacuated by the Fur troops, leaving some of their supplies behind. On 19 May, RFC reconnaissance aircraft reported there was no trace of any Fur troops within . However, the Anglo-Egyptian force was exhausted from their cross country march and remained resting at Meliat.

Battle of Beringia

At 05:30 on 22 May, the Anglo-Egyptian advance continued, but the nature of the country, which consisted mainly of rolling low level sand-hills, with plenty of concealed ground and scattered bushes, reduced visibility down to just a few hundred yards. From the start, large groups of Fur camaliers and cavalry were observed. So instead of sending out his scouts Kelly formed an advance guard of the mounted infantry, a camel company and four Maxim machine guns. At 10:30, the Fur troops were observed in a strong entrenched position around the village of Beringia.

The Fur Army commander, Ramadan Ali, had established a  crescent shaped trench, mostly concealed from the advancing Anglo-Egyptians by a wadi. Ali's plan was for them advance close enough for him to ambush them with his trench system, believing that his larger force would overrun their artillery and machine guns before they could cause any serious damage to his troops.

The Anglo-Egyptian artillery opened fire on the Fur trenches, driving the Fur troops back. The Anglo-Egyptians formed a square and advanced , then started digging trenches of their own. At the same time, the advance guard were ordered to man a higher position to the right front and south-west of the square. To counter a threat from Fur cavalry from his left, Kelly sent a Camel Corps company and a Maxim machine gun section to secure the higher ground there.

The Anglo-Egyptian forces were established  from Beringia. Kelly's scouts could not get into a position to see all of the Fur Army positions so Kelly made the decision to launch an immediate attack. While he was organising the assault, Huddleston commanding the Camel Corps company escorting the artillery and machine guns on the right of the square, exceeded his orders and entered the village. Exiting to the south they came under heavy fire from the Fur defenders and were forced to withdraw, pursued by some of the Fur troops. However, when they came within range of the Anglo-Egyptian square, their artillery and machine guns opened fire on their open flank. Seeing this, the remainder of the Fur Army left their trenches and attacked the southern side of the square in strength. The south of the square was manned from left to right by an artillery battery, three infantry companies, another artillery battery, one infantry company and a Maxim section. There was then a gap of around  before another infantry company and a Maxim section were positioned facing east. Kelly now reinforced the south of the square with two Maxim sections and a company from the Arab Battalion. Kelly ordered an infantry counter-attack, supported by his artillery, with the Maxim guns advancing alongside the infantry. The Fur Army broke and the survivors retreated, leaving 231 dead, ninety-six seriously wounded and another 1,000 less seriously wounded behind, from a force of over 3,600. Anglo-Egyptian casualties were four officers wounded, five other ranks dead and eighteen wounded. At 16:00, Kelly resumed his advance to El Fasher stopping for the night just short of the capital.

The Fur Army were not defeated and a force of 500 cavalry and 300 infantry attacked the Anglo-Egyptian camp at 03:00 on 23 May. Kelly's artillery opened fire with starshells, lighting up the battleground. The attack was defeated, Fur casualties are not known, but the only Anglo-Egyptian casualty was a wounded gunner. Later that day, at 06:00 the Anglo-Egyptians were just about to break camp, when several hundred Fur troops appeared on their left flank. They were engaged and forced to withdraw by artillery, machine gun fire and aerial bombardment. At 10:00, Kelly and his mounted troops entered the capital, finding it deserted except for some women. Sultan Ali Dinar had left El Fasher accompanied by 2,000 troops after hearing about the defeat at Beringia. Captured in the city were four artillery pieces, 55,000 rounds of small arms ammunition and 4,000 rifles.

Dibbis and Kulme

Sultan Ali Dinar, fled to the Jebel Marra mountains  to the south-west of El Fasher, with around 2,000 men, Kelly's troops were unable to immediately pursue him, due to a lack of supplies and exhaustion. However, Dinar approached the Anglo Egyptians offering to discuss surrender terms. Discussions continued until 1 August, when Kelly broke off the talks, as it had become apparent that Dinar was just stalling for time. Dinar's followers had started to desert him and at that point he was only left with around 1,000 men. They reached Dibbis on 13 October, engaging a Fur force of 150 riflemen and 1,000 men armed with spears, defeating them after a short fight. Following this, Dinar once again approached the Anglo Egyptians to discuss terms. When once again it appeared Dinar was only stalling, Kelly dispatched 100 men from the 13th Sudanese Infantry to reinforce Huddleston.

Huddleston had discovered Dinar was in hiding at Kulme  to the west. The remaining Fur troops were in a poor condition, hungry and diseased and little resistance was expected to Huddleston's troops. Without waiting for reinforcements Huddleston marched on Kulme. Occupying the village almost unopposed on 3 November, they captured several hundred prisoners and most of Dinar's remaining military stores. Some of his immediate family also surrendered at the same time.

Dinar, avoiding battle, fled to Jebel Juba to the south-west of Kulme. Two days later, on 5 November, Huddleston with 150 men, an artillery piece and four Maxim machine guns, mounted on captured horses, set off in pursuit. Huddleston's troops discovered the body of Dinar shot through the head.

Aftermath

On 1 November 1917, after the expedition, the independent country of Darfur, and its inhabitants, became part of Sudan. The £500,000 bill for the cost of the expedition was sent to the Egyptian Government in Cairo for payment by the Egyptian taxpayers. The British commanders of the operation were also recognised. In 1917, Wingate became the British High Commissioner for Egypt. The commander of the Anglo-Egyptian expedition, Kelly, became the first Governor of the Darfur province with his office located in the Sultan's palace throne room until May 1917. He was then promoted to brigadier general and given command of the 5th Mounted Brigade, which was part of the Australian Mounted Division fighting in Palestine.

See also

 War in Darfur, the rebellion of Darfur against the Sudanese government (2003–present)

References
Footnotes

Citations

Sources

Further reading

External links
 The Soldier's Burden: Darfur 1916

Darfur
Conflicts in 1916
1916 in Sudan
Battles of World War I involving the United Kingdom
Military history of Sudan
British colonisation in Africa
Egypt in World War I
African theatre of World War I